The Genie of the Lamp is the tenth studio album by Bay Area rapper Mac Dre released on July 20, 2004.

Track listing
"Genie of the Lamp"
"She Neva Seen"
"Early Retirement"
"Out There"
"My Alphabets" (feat. Suga Free and Rappin' 4-Tay)
"Err Thang" (feat. J-Diggs)
"Non Discriminant"  (feat. PSD)
"Hear Me Now ?"
"I Feed My Bitch"  (feat. Keak Da Sneak and B.A.)
"Not My Job"
"Hotel, Motel"  Produced by Lev Berlak
"2 Times & Pass"
"Make You Mine"
"Crest Shit"  (feat. Dubee, Da'unda'dogg and J-Diggs)
"Bonus Track"

2004 albums
Mac Dre albums
Thizz Entertainment albums